Phyaces is a monotypic genus of Sri Lankan jumping spiders containing the single species, Phyaces comosus. It was first described by Eugène Louis Simon in 1902, and is only found in Sri Lanka.

References

External links
 Photograph of P. comosus

Endemic fauna of Sri Lanka
Monotypic Salticidae genera
Salticidae
Spiders of Asia